A Tornado in the Saddle is a 1942 American Western film directed by William Berke and written by Charles F. Royal. The film stars Russell Hayden, Dub Taylor, Alma Carroll, Bob Wills, Tris Coffin and Donald Curtis. The film was released on December 15, 1942, by Columbia Pictures.

Plot

Cast          
Russell Hayden as Lucky Crandall
Dub Taylor as Cannonball
Alma Carroll as Madge Duncan
Bob Wills as Bob Wilson 
Tris Coffin as Hutch Dalton
Donald Curtis as Steve Duncan 
Jack Baxley as Big Bill Bailey

References

External links
 

1942 films
1940s English-language films
American Western (genre) films
1942 Western (genre) films
Columbia Pictures films
Films directed by William A. Berke
American black-and-white films
1940s American films